Caracolí is a town and municipality in Antioquia Department, Colombia, It has an extension of 260 km². It has unique woodlands, with many species of animals and plants.

History
It was founded in 1866.

Economy
 Tourism

Municipalities of Antioquia Department